The Southeast Sun Online Edition is one of three media outlets for QST Publications of Enterprise, Alabama.  QST Publications is a family-owned corporation that publishes two weekly newspapers: The Southeast Sun, Enterprise; and the Daleville Sun-Courier, Daleville.  The online edition is a compilation of articles from the two weekly newspapers.  The targeted service area is Coffee County, Dale County, and Fort Rucker, which are in Southeast Alabama near the borders with Florida and Georgia.  The oldest of these outlets is The Southeast Sun, publishing since 1982.

References 
 Worldcat.org listing for "The Southeast sun".
 Worldcat.org listing for "Daleville sun-courier".
 www.southeastsun.com About Us page.

American news websites
Newspapers published in Alabama
Weekly newspapers published in the United States